Bassam Zuamut (March 27, 1951 – October 16, 2004) was a Palestinian Israeli Arab actor and screenwriter.

Biography
Bassam Zuamut was born in Jerusalem. He studied acting at Beth Rothschild.

Zuamut participated in many theater productions of the Jerusalem Khan Theatre, such as: "Antigone", "Measure for Measure" and "Abu Nimer stories" by Dahn Ben-Amotz.
He also took part in the Al Qasba theater productions, such as: "Romeo and Juliet" and "The Marriage of Figaro". At Beit Lessin Theater he appeared in "A Trumpet in the Wadi".

He was best known for his role as Hakim the Chef on the Israeli sitcom HaMis'ada HaGdola.

Death
Zuamut died on October 16, 2004 in Shuafat as a result of a severe kidney ailment. He was 53 years old.

Filmography

Cinema 
Actor

 1998 : Zirkus Palestina
 1996 : Haifa
 1993 : The Seventh Coin
 1991 : Gmar Gavia
 1980 : Imi Hageneralit

Television 
Actor

 2000-2001 : De-Lux Family - Abu Osama
 1989-1992 : Neighbors - Bassam Maudar
 1985-1988 : HaMis'ada HaGdola - Hakim
 1979-1982 : Stories by Halil - Halil

Screenwriter 
 2000-2001 : De-Lux Family

See also
Theater of Israel
Israeli television

References

External links
 

1951 births
2004 deaths
Male actors from Jerusalem
Israeli Arab Christians
Israeli male film actors
Israeli male stage actors
Israeli male television actors
Israeli male screenwriters
20th-century Israeli male actors
21st-century Israeli male actors
20th-century Israeli screenwriters
21st-century Israeli screenwriters
Deaths from kidney disease